Dino Skender (born 10 December 1983) is a Croatian professional football manager. Besides Croatia, he has managed in Slovenia.

Managerial career
Skender started his managerial career at the age of 33, as the head coach of the second team of NK Osijek in the Croatian Third League. On 30 March 2019, following the departure of Zoran Zekić, he was appointed the head coach of the first team. Skender was sacked from Osijek on 21 September 2019. 

On 19 June 2020, Skender was named head coach of Slovenian PrvaLiga club Olimpija Ljubljana. After finishing second in the first part of the 2020–21 season, he was sacked on 8 January 2021 along with all of his staff members. Skender was again appointed as head coach of Olimpija on 12 October 2021, replacing Savo Milošević. However, on 20 March 2022, he was sacked again without finishing the season, after a 1–1 home draw against Domžale.

Managerial statistics

Honours
Osijek II
Croatian Third League – East: 2017–18

References

1983 births
Living people
Sportspeople from Osijek
Croatian football managers
NK Osijek managers
NK Olimpija Ljubljana (2005) managers
Expatriate football managers in Slovenia
Croatian expatriate sportspeople in Slovenia
Croatian Football League managers
Croatian expatriate football managers